Santa Lucia Airport refers to Felipe Ángeles International Airport (IATA: NLU), an air force base and site of the new airport for Mexico City after cancellation of the Texcoco airport project, Tecámac, State of Mexico, or it may refer to:

 Hewanorra International Airport (IATA: UVF, ICAO: TLPL), near Vieux Fort, Saint Lucia
 Joaquín de Agüero Airport (ICAO: MUSL) near Santa Lucia, Camagüey province, Cuba
 Santa Lucía Airport (Chile), in Santa Lucía, Chile